Sonam Mukherjee (born Mumbai, India) is an Indian actress and fashion model.

Mukherjee was a finalist at the I Am She-Miss Universe India beauty pageant in 2010. She made her acting debut in the Hindi film ?: A Question Mark, released in 2012. She was praised for her role as Simran, who becomes a victim of ghostly entities. Her portrayal of a possessed girl earned her a nomination in the Best Supporting Actress category at the St. Tropez International France film festival in 2014.
   
Mukherjee attended school in Mumbai at St. Joseph's Convent, Bandra. She graduated with a degree in Chemistry from Wilson College, Mumbai, where she played field hockey. She currently trains in Kathak dance under dancer Shila Mehta.

References

External links
 

Living people
Indian film actresses
Actresses from Mumbai
Indian Hindus
Actresses in Hindi cinema
Year of birth missing (living people)